Edward Joseph Scrobe (January 26, 1923 – November 24, 2017) was an American artistic gymnast who competed in the 1948 and 1952 Summer Olympics. He died in November 2017 at the age of 94.

References

1923 births
2017 deaths
American male artistic gymnasts
Gymnasts at the 1948 Summer Olympics
Gymnasts at the 1952 Summer Olympics
Olympic gymnasts of the United States
Sportspeople from New York City